Lan Minghao (born 28 August 1996) is a Chinese épée fencer. He competed in the 2020 Summer Olympics.

References

1996 births
Living people
Sportspeople from Beijing
People from Hefei
Fencers at the 2020 Summer Olympics
Chinese male épée fencers
Olympic fencers of China
Asian Games medalists in fencing
Fencers at the 2018 Asian Games
Medalists at the 2018 Asian Games
Asian Games silver medalists for China
21st-century Chinese people